The 2011 Gastein Ladies was a professional women's tennis tournament played on  outdoor clay courts. It was the fifth edition of the tournament which was part of the 2011 WTA Tour. It took place in Bad Gastein, Austria between 11 and 18 July 2011. María José Martínez Sánchez won the singles title.

WTA entrants

Seeds

 1 Rankings are as of July 4, 2011.

Other entrants
The following players received wildcards into the singles main draw:
  Nikola Hofmanova
  Melanie Klaffner
  Patricia Mayr-Achleitner

The following players received entry from the qualifying draw:

  Dia Evtimova
  Nastja Kolar
  Paula Ormaechea
  Sofia Shapatava

Finals

Singles

 María José Martínez Sánchez defeated  Patricia Mayr-Achleitner, 6–0, 7–5
It was her first title of the year and fourth of her career.

Doubles

 Eva Birnerová /  Lucie Hradecká defeated  Jarmila Gajdošová /  Julia Görges, 4–6, 6–2, [12–10]

External links
Official website

2011 WTA Tour
2011
2011 in Austrian women's sport
July 2011 sports events in Europe
2011 in Austrian tennis